Rail Club du Kadiogo is a Burkinabé football and basketball club based in Ouagadougou. They play their home games at the Stade de Kadiogo.

The club plays in orange and black.

Honours
Burkinabé Premier League: 4
 2004-2005, 2015-2016, 2016-2017, 2021-22

Coupe du Faso: 3
 1994, 2012, 2016.

Burkinabé SuperCup: 2
 2012, 2016.

Performance in CAF competitions
CAF Champions League: 1 appearance
2006 - Preliminary Round
CAF Cup Winners' Cup: 7 appearances
1976 - First Round
1977 - Quarter-Finals
1978 - Semi-Finals
1979 - Quarter-Finals
1980 - Semi-Finals
1981 - First Round
1993 - First Round

Current squad

Notable players

 Harouna Bamogo
 Jeannot Bouyain
 Siaka Coulibaly
 Eric Dagbei
 Derra Hamadou
 Bèbè Kambou
 Constant Kambou
 Ibrahim Kano
 Amara Ouattara
 Seydou Traoré
 Ernest Yélémou
 Hamidou Djibo
 Saidou Idrissa
 Alhassan Issoufou
 Idrissa Laouali
 Ibrahim Tankary

Basketball team
The club's also has a basketball team that plays in the Burkinabé Men's Basketball Championship, and has traditionally been one of the country's elite teams alongside AS Sonabhy. RCK has won the league championship in 2016, 2017, 2018 and 2019.

References

1967 establishments in Upper Volta
Association football clubs established in 1967
Basketball teams established in 1967
Football clubs in Burkina Faso
Kadiogo Province